Richard Horace Sikes (born March 6, 1940) is an American professional golfer who played on the PGA Tour in the 1960s and 1970s.

A native of Paris, Arkansas, Sikes had a stellar amateur and college career as a member of the golf team at the University of Arkansas. He won the U.S. Amateur Public Links in 1961 and 1962. In 1963, he won the NCAA Championship, was runner-up at the U.S. Amateur, and played on the victorious Walker Cup team. Sikes' victory at the NCAA Championship was the only Razorbacks national championship recognized by the NCAA until John McDonnell's track and field teams of the mid-1980s to mid-1990s started winning them, and Nolan Richardson's basketball program won the 1994 men's basketball crown.

Sikes was victorious at the 1964 Sahara Invitational during his rookie season on the PGA Tour, and earned Golf Digest's Rookie of the Year Award. He played briefly on the Senior PGA Tour from 1990 to 1992 with his best finish a T36 at Raley's Senior Gold Rush in 1992.

In 2002, he was inducted into the Arkansas Golf Hall of Fame.

Amateur wins
1961 U.S. Amateur Public Links
1962 U.S. Amateur Public Links
1963 NCAA Championship (individual)

Professional wins (4)

PGA Tour wins (2)

PGA Tour playoff record (0–1)

Other wins (2)
1962 Arizona Open (as an amateur)
1981 Southern California PGA Championship

U.S. national team appearances
Amateur
Walker Cup: 1963 (winners)
Eisenhower Trophy: 1962 (winners)
Americas Cup: 1963 (winners)

References

External links

American male golfers
Arkansas Razorbacks men's golfers
PGA Tour golfers
PGA Tour Champions golfers
Golfers from Arkansas
People from Paris, Arkansas
1940 births
Living people